Bacanora is a small town in Bacanora Municipality in the east of the Mexican state of Sonora.

Area and population
The area of the  municipality (rural and urban) is 903.17 km2.  The population of the municipality was 943 inhabitants in 2005, with 568 residing in the municipal seat (2000 census).

History and origin of the name
Originally this territory was inhabited by the Opata Joba Indians; in 1627 the Jesuit missionary Pedro Méndez established the first settlement; its name is derived from the Opata language, from the roots "baca", meaning reed, and "nora" meaning slope of reeds.  Bacanora became a municipality in 1932.

Geography
Most of the region lies in the foothills of the Sierra Madre Occidental.  The Bacanora River crosses the area from south to north and flows into the Yaqui River, which flows across the northern region of the municipality.  The town lies at an elevation of 1,030 meters above sea level.

The fauna in the region is still relatively numerous with deer, puma, owls, coyote, jaguar, lynx, raccoons, skunks, eagles, to name a few, present.

The region has been losing population due to immigration to the United States.  Since 1995 the population has decreased 3.39%.

Economy
The economy is heavily dependent on cattle raising.  There were approximately 17,000 head in 2000.  The percentage of the population living in poverty in one of the highest in the state, as a consequence of the land belonging to a few landowners and the majority of the workers working as day workers.

Agriculture is modest with some production of corn, beans, and sorghum.

Agave is planted to produce the regionally famous Aguardiente de Bacanora.

Communications
There is a tarmacked road linking Bacanora with the state capital Hermosillo, which lies at a distance of 181 km.

Tourist attractions

In the village the main tourist attraction is the mission church of San Ignacio de Loyola, built in the seventeenth century.

Sources consulted
INEGI
Enciclopedia de los Municipios de Mexico
Gobierno de Sonora: Bacanora

Specific

External links
Bacanora de Sonora (broken link)The producers of the local drink
Bacanora Wikipedia article about the drink
(broken link)Article on the drink from Sonora Turismo
https://www.sunorabacanora.com/what-is-bacanora/

Populated places in Sonora
Populated places established in 1627